Ivica Đikić is a Bosnian writer and journalist. He was born 1977, in  Tomislavgrad, SR Bosnia and Herzegovina, Yugoslavia.

Career

Journalist career
He worked as a journalist for few Croatian newspapers, and he left the most impact on far left newspaper Feral Tribune from Split where he worked in 1996. He started to work as a journalist from his 16, he was also active in Slobodna Dalmacija. From 2001 he edited few Croatian magazines like Novi list.

Writing career
He published his first novel in 2003 named Cirkus Columbia, published by Feral Tribune. He is also awarded with Meša Selimović Award for this novel. The 2010 movie Cirkus Columbia is based on his novel. The novel is set in writer's hometown Tomislavgrad, a small town in Herzegovina in early 1990s, just before Bosnian War. In 2004 Đikić published political biography of former Croatian president Stjepan Mesić named Domovinski obrat, published by VBZ from Zagreb. In 2007 Đikić wrote his second novel called Ništa sljezove boje, published by Feral Tribune. This new novel is composed of three stories, Zeleni dvorac, Probaj zaspati, molim te and Kao da ništa nije bilo. He is also the primary writer of the television series Novine.

References

 Slobodna Dalmacija. Ivica Đikić novi glavni urednik "Novosti". October 22, 2010.
 Jutarnji list. Glavni urednik Novog lista Ivica Đikić podnio ostavku . March 30, 2010.

Croatian journalists
Croatian novelists
Croatian male writers
Male novelists
People from Split, Croatia
1977 births
Living people